Bethany Hart (born April 10, 1977) is a retired American hammer thrower.

She competed at the 2005 World Championships without reaching the final.

Her personal best throw was 69.89 metres, achieved in June 2008 in West Point.

References

1977 births
Living people
American female hammer throwers
Place of birth missing (living people)
21st-century American women